The 2022 CAA women's soccer tournament was the postseason women's soccer tournament for the Colonial Athletic Association held from October 27 through November 5, 2022. The Quarterfinals and Semifinals of the tournament were hosted by the first and second seed and the final was hosted by the highest remaining seed. The eight-team single-elimination tournament consisted of two rounds based on seeding from regular season conference play. The defending champions were the Hofstra Pride, who successfully defendeded their title, despite being the eighth and final team to qualify for the tournament.  Hofstra won the tournament by defeating Northeastern 2–1 in overtime the final. The conference tournament title was the eighth overall for the Hofstra women's soccer program and the seventh overall for head coach Simon Riddiough.  Both Hofstra and Riddiough have won five of the last six CAA Tournaments. As tournament champions, Hofstra earned the CAA's automatic berth into the 2022 NCAA Division I women's soccer tournament.

Seeding 
Eight Colonial Athletic Association schools participated in the tournament. Teams were seeded by conference record.  Multiple tiebreakers were required to determine seedings.  The first tiebreaker was for the second and third seeds between Drexel and Northeastern who finished the regular season with identical 5–2–2 records.  Drexel won the tiebreaker and was awarded hosting rights for two Quarterfinals and a Semifinal game as the second seed.  Elon and Towson both finished the season with sixteen points and Elon won the tiebreaker to be the fourth seed.  Finally there was a tiebreaker for the eighth and final seed between Hofstra and UNC Wilmington who both finished with 3–4–2 regular season records.  Hofstra won the regular season matchup between the two teams 2–1 on October 13, and qualified for the tournament as the eighth seed.

Bracket

Source:

Schedule

Quarterfinals

Semifinals

Final

Statistics

Goalscorers

All-Tournament team

Source:

MVP in bold

References 

Colonial Athletic Association women's soccer tournament
2022 Colonial Athletic Association women's soccer season